Turpin Hills is a census-designated place (CDP) outside of  Anderson Township, Hamilton County, Ohio, United States. The population was 5,162 at the 2020 census.

Geography
Turpin Hills is located at  (39.103620, -84.375073).

Demographics

At the 2000 census there were 4,960 people, 1,741 households, and 1,448 families living in the CDP. The population density was 1,668.5 people per square mile (644.8/km). There were 1,810 housing units at an average density of 608.9/sq mi (235.3/km).  The racial makeup of the CDP was 96.63% White, 0.62% African American, 0.34% Native American, 1.63% Asian, 0.30% from other races, and 0.46% from two or more races. Hispanic or Latino of any race were 1.07%.

Of the 1,741 households 42.7% had children under the age of 18 living with them, 75.0% were married couples living together, 6.1% had a female householder with no husband present, and 16.8% were non-families. 13.6% of households were one person and 4.0% were one person aged 65 or older. The average household size was 2.85 and the average family size was 3.16.

The age distribution was 30.6% under the age of 18, 5.3% from 18 to 24, 26.0% from 25 to 44, 29.2% from 45 to 64, and 9.0% 65 or older. The median age was 39 years. For every 100 females, there were 96.3 males. For every 100 females age 18 and over, there were 93.1 males.

The median household income was $84,354 and the median family income  was $93,471. Males had a median income of $63,077 versus $36,795 for females. The per capita income for the CDP was $39,094. About 0.4% of families and 1.0% of the population were below the poverty line, including 0.5% of those under age 18 and 1.8% of those age 65 or over.

References

Census-designated places in Hamilton County, Ohio
Census-designated places in Ohio